Etemenanki (Sumerian:   "temple of the foundation of heaven and earth") was a ziggurat dedicated to the Mesopotamian god Marduk in the ancient city of Babylon.

Although Etemenanki has sometimes suggested to be the Tower of Babel from Genesis 11 in the Bible, its archaeological record is incompatible with the biblical account of the Tower of Babel, particularly the fact that it was built for the god Marduk.

Construction
It is unclear when Etemenanki was originally constructed. Andrew R. George says that it was constructed sometime between the 14th and the 9th century BCE. Although he argues that;
The reference to a ziqqurrat at Babylon in the Creation Epic (Enûma Eliš· VI 63: George 1992: 301–2) is more solid evidence, ... for a Middle Assyrian piece of this poem survives to prove the long-held theory that it existed already in the second millennium BC. There is no reason to doubt that this ziqqurrat, described as ziqqurrat apsî elite, "the upper ziqqurrat of the Apsû", was E-temenanki.

Babylon was destroyed in 689 BCE by Sennacherib, who claims to have destroyed the Etemenanki. It took 88 years to restore the city; work was started by the Assyrian king Esarhaddon, and continued under Nabopolassar followed by his son Nebuchadnezzar II who rebuilt the ziggurat. The city's central feature was the temple of Marduk (Esagila), with which the Etemenanki ziggurat was associated.

Fenollós et al. note that, "The 'Tower of Babel' was not built in a single moment, but rather was the result of a complex history of successive constructions, destruction and reconstruction. Its origin dates back to the reign of Hammurabi and continues to this day with its inevitable and definitive destruction." (Translated from the Italian). The "Tower" as discussed in ancient sources refers to the monument as it appeared in the Neo-Babylonian period.

Descriptions

A Neo-Babylonian royal inscription of Nebuchadnezzar II on a stele from Babylon, claimed to have been found in the 1917 excavation by Robert Koldewey, and of uncertain authenticity, reads: "Etemenanki Zikkurat Babibli [Ziggurat of Babylon] I made it, the wonder of the people of the world, I raised its top to heaven, made doors for the gates, and I covered it with bitumen and bricks." The building is depicted in shallow relief, showing its high first stages with paired flights of steps, five further stepped stages and the temple that surmounted the structure. A floor plan is also shown, depicting the buttressed outer walls and the inner chambers surrounding the central cella.

Foundation cylinders with inscriptions from Nabopolassar were found in the 1880s, two survive, one of which reads:

In 2011 scholars discovered in the Schøyen Collection the oldest known representation of the Etemenanki.  Carved on a black stone, the Tower of Babel Stele, as it is known, dates to 604–562 BCE, the time of Nebuchadnezzar II.

The Etemenanki is described in a cuneiform tablet from Uruk from 229 BCE, a copy of an older text (now in the Louvre, Paris and referred to as the "Esagila" tablet). Translated in 1876 by Assyriologist George Smith, it gives the height of the tower as seven stocks (91 meters) with a square base of 91 meters on each side. This mudbrick structure was confirmed by excavations conducted by Robert Koldewey after 1913. Large stairs were discovered at the south side of the building, where a triple gate connected it with the Esagila. A larger gate to the east connected the Etemenanki with the sacred procession road (now reconstructed in the Pergamon Museum, Berlin).

Until the first translation of the "Esagila" tablet, details of Babylon's ziggurat were known only from the ancient Greek historian Herodotus, who wrote in the mid-5th century BCE:

This Tower of Jupiter Belus is believed to refer to the Akkadian god Bel, whose name has been Hellenised by Herodotus to Zeus Belus. It is likely that it corresponds to Etemenanki. Herodotus does not say that he visited Babylon or the ziggurat, however; the account contains multiple inaccuracies and is most likely second hand.

Final demolition
In 331 BCE, Alexander the Great captured Babylon and ordered repairs to the Etemenanki. When Alexander returned to the ancient city in 323 BCE, he noted that no progress had been made, and ordered his army to demolish the entire building in order to prepare a final rebuilding. His death, however, prevented the reconstruction. The Babylonian Chronicles and Astronomical Diaries record several attempts to rebuild the Etemenanki, which were always preceded by removing the last debris of the original ziggurat. The Ruin of Esagila Chronicle mentions that the Seleucid crown prince Antiochus I decided to rebuild it and made a sacrifice in preparation. However, while there, he stumbled on the rubble and fell. He then angrily ordered his elephant drivers to destroy the last of the remains. There are no later references to the Etemenanki from antiquity.

Modern hypotheses regarding height
Modern scholars dispute the claim by the ancient Babylonian source (the "Esagila" tablet) that the Etemenanki was 91 meters tall. "[The modern] interpretation of Esagil's text raises a serious technical problem: the excessive height of the first two terraces of the ziggurat and the total height of the building defy the laws of statics and compressive strength of a material such as raw earth brick." (Translated from the Italian). Even allowing variation in the design of a six-level terraced structure, at that height, the compression stress on the structure would be somewhere around two to three times as much as comparable structures of the same time period. Fenollós et al. propose that, assuming the structure did indeed use a six-level terrace design as depicted in the Tower of Babel stele, the ziggurat was probably closer to 54 meters tall. The temple at the top contributed another 12 meters in height, for a total height of 66 meters.

In popular culture
In the Portugal Pack of the game Civilization VI, Etemenanki was introduced as one of the wonders in the game.

It is also the name of a ship in IXION, notable for its destroyed state and the inhumane working conditions endured by the crew before its destruction

Image gallery

See also
 List of tallest structures built before the 20th century

Notes

References

A. R. George, "E-sangil and E-temen-anki, the Archetypal Cult-centre?" in: J. Renger, Babylon: Focus mesopotamischer Geschichte, Wiege früher Gelehrsamkeit, Mythos in der Moderne (1999 Saarbrücken)
Hans-Jörg Schmid, Der Tempelturm Etemenanki in Babylon (1995 Mainz) 
The Tower of Babel Stele, Schoyen Collection

Fenollós, Juan Luis & Vegas, Fernando & Mileto, Camilla. (2005). Etemenanki: nuova ipotesi di ricostruzione dello ziggurat di Nabucodonosor II nella cittá di Babilonia. ISIMU: Revista sobre Oriente Próximo y Egipto en la antigüedad 8 (2005): 201-216.

Buildings and structures completed in the 6th century BC
Ziggurats
Tower of Babel
Demolished buildings and structures in Iraq
Babylon